Sebastiania ypanemensis is a species of flowering plant in the family Euphorbiaceae. It was originally described as Gymnanthes ypanemensis Müll.Arg. in 1863. It is native to Minas Gerais and São Paulo, Brazil.

References

Plants described in 1863
Flora of Brazil
ypanemensis